I Want a Solution (translit.Oridu hallan) is a 1975 Egyptian drama film directed by Said Marzouk and produced by Salah Zulfikar. The film was selected as the Egyptian entry for the Best Foreign Language Film at the 48th Academy Awards, but was not accepted as a nominee. The film criticized the laws governing marriage and divorce in Egypt. The film is listed in Top 100 Egyptian films list and it earned the 1975 Ministry of Culture's best producer award for Salah Zulfikar. The script was written by Said Marzouk and Faten Hamama. I Want a Solution is inspired by a true story and it is Marzouk's third feature film.

Plot
The film unveils the injustice of Egypt's personal status laws against women. Doria an Egyptian women is seeking to divorce her husband Methat a former diplomat with aristocratic background. In flashbacks, we learn that Methat verbally and physically abuses his wife and cheats on her. Doria requested divorce, but according to the Egyptian laws, a woman can only ask for divorce in specific cases.

Cast

Primary cast

 Faten Hamama: Doria
 Rushdy Abaza: Medhat
 Amina Rizk: Hayat
 Ragaa Hussein: Actress
 Laila Taher: Actress
 Yulius Zagoni: Krad
 Muhammad Al-Sabaa: (Ahmed Al-Adawy - Doria’s lawyer)
 Ahmed Tawfik: (Hassan Madkour - Medhat's lawyer)
 Ragaa Hussein: (Sunni)
 Nadia Arslan: (The Mistress)
 Ali Al-Sharif: (Abu Al-Wafa - Azhari Sharia lawyer)
 Kamal Zulfikar: Hayat's husband
 Shawky Baraka: (judge)
 Ibrahim Saafan: (Badawi - Ardahhalji in court)
 Sayed Zayan: (Darwish)
 Waheed Seif: (Abbas)
 Osama Abbas: (Pharmacist)
 Ibrahim Qadri: (witness in court)
 Sherif Lotfy: (Raouf Azmy)

Supporting cast
 Hesham Selim
 Suhair Sami
 Fathia Shaheen
 Naima Al Sagheer
 Laila Fahmy
 Kawthar Shafik
 Abdul Aleem Khattab
 Hussein Qandil
 Sophie Takla
 Ali Ezz El Din
 Raafat Fahim
 Mahmoud Kamel
 Radwan Hafez
 Marwan Hammad

See also
 Salah Zulfikar filmography
 List of Egyptian films of 1975
 List of Egyptian films of the 1970s
 List of Egyptian submissions for the Academy Award for Best Foreign Language Film
 List of submissions to the 48th Academy Awards for Best Foreign Language Film

References

External links
 

1975 films
1975 drama films
Egyptian drama films
1970s Arabic-language films